Goldback fern is a common name for several plants and may refer to:

 Pentagramma triangularis, native to western North America
 Pityrogramma